CHXX-FM (100.9 FM, BPM Sports 100.9 Québec) is a French-language radio station in Quebec City, Quebec. Owned by RNC Media, it carries a sports talk format as an affiliate of RNC's BPM Sports network.

It broadcasts with an effective radiated power of 1,585 watts (class B) using an omnidirectional antenna. The station also has one rebroadcaster, operating on 105.5 FM in Lotbinière.

History 
Under its former call sign CKNU, the station had a classic rock format and was largely automated. It was best known for having been the home of controversial host André Arthur from August 2002 until December 2005. RNC Media fired most employees, including Arthur, after it acquired the station from Genex Communications in December 2005.

As of July 31, 2007, CKNU changed its call name to CHXX-FM and became Radio X2 100 9, a modern rock radio station similar to its sister modern rock station Radio X (CHOI-FM, which is now a talk station). In August 2019, the station rebranded as simply 100,9, with an adult hits format. 

In 2021, the station flipped to contemporary hit radio as Vibe 100.9; the station shared its branding and airstaff with CFTX-FM in Gatineau. On August 29, 2022, both Vibe stations flipped to sports talk as BPM Sports, networked with Montreal sister station CKLX-FM. Due to CRTC license restrictions requiring at least 50% of their weekly programming to be devoted to music, the stations only carry BPM Sports' weekday and weekend morning lineups, do not carry its play-by-play rights (such as CF Montréal), and otherwise continue to carry music programming. The station's local sports programming is currently limited to La Tribune Capitale, a Quebec City-based program that is part of the network schedule.

References

External links
 BPM Sports 100.9 Québec
 
 

Radio stations in Quebec City
Modern rock radio stations in Canada
French-language radio stations in Quebec
RNC Media radio stations
Year of establishment missing